Organizational performance comprises the actual output or results of an organization as measured against its intended outputs (or goals and objectives).
Organizational performance is also the success or fulfillment of organization at the end of program or projects as it is intended.
According to Richard et al. (2009) organizational performance encompasses three specific areas of firm outcomes: (a) financial
performance (profits, return on assets, return on investment, etc.); (b) product market performance (sales, market share, etc.); and (c) shareholder return (total shareholder return, economic value added, etc.). The term Organizational effectiveness is broader.

Specialists in many fields are concerned with organizational performance including strategic planners, operations, finance, legal, and organizational development.

In recent years, many organizations have attempted to manage organizational performance using the balanced scorecard methodology where performance is tracked and measured in multiple dimensions such as:

 financial performance (e.g. shareholder return)
 customer service
 social responsibility (e.g. corporate citizenship, community outreach)
 employee stewardship
 Organizational performance
 performance measurement systems
 performance improvement
 organizational engineering
 Pluralistic stakeholder values

See also 
 Organizational performance management.

People involved in research

 Rosabeth Moss Kanter

References

Further reading 
 Defining success through strategic planning and priority goal setting
 The Balanced Scorecard
 Scrum Training (in German)
 Organizational Performance Management

Organizational theory